"Big Jet Plane" is a song written by Australian singer and songwriter Angus Stone, originally recorded under the stage name "Lady of the Sunshine" for his 2009 album Smoking Gun. It was then re-recorded the following year by Stone and his sister Julia as a duo. On 26 January 2011, Australian radio station Triple J announced that the Angus & Julia Stone version of "Big Jet Plane" was the winner of its 2010 Hottest 100 countdown.

Angus & Julia Stone version

"Big Jet Plane" was re-recorded by Angus & Julia Stone and released in May 2010 as the third single from the duo's second studio album Down the Way. The song peaked at number 21 in Australia and has been certified platinum. Additionally, the song has peaked inside the 40 in New Zealand, France and Belgium.

At the ARIA Music Awards of 2010, "Big Jet Plane" won the ARIA Award for Single of the Year. On 26 January 2011, the song was voted number 1 on the Triple J Hottest 100, 2010. On 14 March 2020, the song was voted number 9 on the Triple J Hottest 100 of the 2010s.

It gained additional success, especially in Europe, when it was remixed in 2011 as a house track by Australian DJs Goodwill and Hook N Sling, under the title "Take You Higher".

Track listing
"Big Jet Plane" – 3:42 
"Living on a Rainbow" – 4:48
"My Malakai" – 3:05 
"You're the One That I Want" – 3:14

Chart performance
The week following the ARIA Music Awards of 2010, the song made a massive leap from #47 to #21 on the ARIA Chart, giving the song its peak position in its 22nd week of release. In total the song has spent 33 weeks in Australia's ARIA Charts.

Charts

Weekly charts

Year-end charts

Certifications

Cover versions
Papa vs Pretty covered the song at the 2011 Apra Music Awards. Goodwill and Hook N Sling remixed the song and renamed it "Take You Higher". Also in 2011, Jan Blomqvist covered and recreated an electronic version of the song.

In November 2015, Australian rapper Tuka and Thelma Plum covered the song for Triple J Like a Version, modifying the song with substantial additional verse lyrics. Tuka's cover was voted at 81 in the Triple J Hottest 100, 2015.

Alok and Mathieu Koss version

In September 2017, Brazilian DJ and producer Alok and French DJ/producer Mathieu Koss made a cover of the song. This new EDM version reached the 1st place in the top100 on iTunes and Shazam in Brazil. It was placed in many national airplay charts: in France, Italy, Spain, Belgium, Russia and many more. This version as gained more than 200 million streams on Spotify, Apple Music and YouTube. In 2018 Big Jet Plane was nominated for the Best Video Clip of the Year in the MTV Millennial Awards.

Charts

Appearances in media
The song was used in TV series including 90210,  One Tree Hill,  Parenthood, and Suits. It also appears on the soundtrack of French film Romantics Anonymous. A music video featuring scenes from the film was released on 9 November 2010. "Big Jet Plane" was also used in the films Easy A and The Edge of Seventeen.

The duo performed the song on French television show Taratata on 19 May 2010.

The song is heard in a Maybelline Fit Me commercial.

References

2009 songs
2010 EPs
2010 singles
2017 singles
Alok (DJ) songs
Angus & Julia Stone songs
APRA Award winners
ARIA Award-winning songs
Songs written by Julia Stone